Democratic Centre Union (DEK, Greek: Δημοκρατική Ένωση Κέντρου (Δ.Ε.Κ.)) was a Greek Centre-left political party. It was founded by Ioannis Zidgis who was expelled from the Centre Union during the presidency of Georgios Mavros. It participated in the 1974 election and failed to enter the parliament. Before the 1977 election the party merged into Union of the Democratic Centre.

Liberal parties in Greece
Social liberal parties
1974 establishments in Greece
Defunct liberal political parties
Defunct political parties in Greece
Political parties established in 1974
Political parties disestablished in 1977
1977 disestablishments in Greece